Yim may refer to:
Im (Korean surname) or Yim, a common Korean surname. See Jangheung Yim clan.
YIM or Yahoo! Messenger

People with the surname
YIM, Chung-sik (任), Korean general and former minister of defense, Republic of Korea
IM, Jong-seok (任), Korean politician
Louise YIM (任), founder of Chung-Ang University.
YIM, Jae-Beom (任), Korean legendary singer
YIM, Sang A (林), Korean former pop star turned designer of handbags
YIM, Seulong (林), Korean teen pop idol
Yim Ho (嚴), Hong Kong director 
Yim Wing-chun (嚴), legendary Chinese martial arts master, creator of Wing Chun
Michelle Yim, (嚴), Hong Kong actress
Jay Alan Yim, Chinese American composer
Y I M, American child star

See also
Yan (disambiguation)
Ran (disambiguation)
Yam (disambiguation)
Ren (disambiguation)
Yim Dai (炎帝), Cantonese ruler name Yan Di
Yim Tin Tsai (Tai Po District) (鹽田仔), an island of Hong Kong
Yim Liu Ha (鹽寮下), Sha Tau Kok, Hong Kong
Yim Ebbin syndrome, a congenital disorder
Yim Yames or Jim James, guitarist